The Schorpioen-class monitors were a pair of ironclad monitors built abroad for the Royal Netherlands Navy in the 1860s. They had uneventful careers and were stricken from the Navy List in the first decade of the 20th century.  became a target ship and was sunk in 1925.  was converted into an accommodation ship in 1909. She was captured by the Germans during World War 2, but survived the war. She remained in service until 1982 and then became a museum ship.

Design and description
The Schorpioen-class ships were designed to the same specification, but varied somewhat in details. The dimensions here are for Schorpioen, with her British-built sister, Stier, being marginally smaller. They displaced  and was fitted with a ram bow. Their crew consisted of 110–136 officers and enlisted men.

The Schorpioen class were twin-engined ships, with each engine driving one  propeller. Stier was equipped with horizontal trunk steam engines that used steam from four square boilers. Schorpioen had a pair of two-cylinder compound-expansion steam engines powered by four boilers. The ships had two pole masts.

The Schorpioens were armed with a pair of Armstrong  rifled, muzzle-loading guns mounted in the Coles-type gun turret. The gun turret was protected by  inches of armor and the armor thickness increased to  around the gun ports.

Ships

Service
The ships had uneventful careers since the Netherlands was at peace during their careers. Stier was stricken in 1908 and later sunk as a target for aircraft in 1925. Schorpioen was sunk at dock when she was accidentally rammed by another ship in 1886. The monitor was refloated and stricken in 1906. She was hulked and converted into an accommodation ship in 1909.
The ship was captured by the Germans during World War 2, but survived the war. Schorpioen remained in service until 1982 when she was purchased by a private foundation for restoration as a museum ship in Rotterdam. She was repurchased by the Dutch Navy in 1995 and moved to the Dutch Navy Museum in Den Helder.

See also 
 List of ironclads

Notes

References

External links

Photo-collection on Dutch ironclads
  HMLMS Schorpioen at Dutch Naval Museum

Ironclad classes